Hamilton Palace is the now-demolished former residence of the Dukes of Hamilton in Scotland.

Hamilton Palace may also refer to:

 Hamilton Palace (Hoogstraten), a private stately home and mausoleum built by property developer Nicholas van Hoogstraten near Uckfield, East Essex
 Hamilton Palace, a nightclub in Hamilton, Scotland, named for the palace
Hamilton Palace (film), a 2011 Bollywood film.